Franz Göring (born 22 October 1984) is a German cross-country skier who has been competing since 2002. He won a silver medal in the 4 × 10 km event at the FIS Nordic World Ski Championships 2009 in Liberec and had his best individual finish of sixth in the 15 km at the 2007 championships in Sapporo.

Göring also finished 44th in the 15 km event at the 2006 Winter Olympics in Turin.

He has eight overall individual victories at various levels at various distances up to 15 km since 2002.

Cross-country skiing results
All results are sourced from the International Ski Federation (FIS).

Olympic Games

World Championships
 2 medals – (1 silver, 1 bronze)

World Cup

Season standings

Individual podiums
1 victory – (1 ) 
3 podiums – (1 , 2 )

Team podiums
 2 victories – (2 ) 
 3 podiums – (3 )

References

External links

1979 births
Living people
People from Suhl
German male cross-country skiers
Sportspeople from Thuringia
Cross-country skiers at the 2006 Winter Olympics
Olympic cross-country skiers of Germany
FIS Nordic World Ski Championships medalists in cross-country skiing
21st-century German people